Hirohito and the Making of Modern Japan is a book by Herbert P. Bix covering the reign of Emperor Shōwa of Japan from 1926 until his death in 1989. It won the 2001 Pulitzer Prize for General Non-Fiction.

Much of the information in the book was uncovered by Japanese people who worked with Bix, but publishing companies and press in Japan at the time chose not to reveal the information. Bix stated that he did not want the book to be used as a weapon against the Japanese people.

References

External links

Hirohito and the Making of Modern Japan at Google Books
Presentation by Bix on Hirohito and the Making of Modern Japan, September 15, 2000
Booknotes interview with Bix on Hirohito and the Making of Modern Japan, September 2, 2001

2000 non-fiction books
History books about Japan
Pulitzer Prize for General Non-Fiction-winning works
Hirohito
Shōwa period